Adam M. Prentice (born January 16, 1997) is an American football fullback for the New Orleans Saints of the National Football League (NFL). He played college football at South Carolina and Colorado State.

Early years
Prentice was born in Fresno on January 16, 1997, to Renae and Gary Prentice. He graduated from Clovis High in 2015, receiving the Bnai Brith award from Fresno County for his outstanding community service, excelling academically, in track, wrestling, and football.  Prentice would place 5th in the Valley in the shot put, 2nd in the state in wrestling, and was the Fresno Bee defensive player of the year. Prentice would lose his father Gary suddenly to cancer his senior year at Clovis High.  The memory of his father would inspire Prentice throughout college.

College career
Prentice began his collegiate career at Colorado State. He join the team as a walk-on and redshirted his true freshman season. Prentice was named the Rams' starting fullback and awarded a scholarship before suffering a season-ending injury shortly before the start of his redshirt freshman season. Prentice served as Colorado State's primary fullback for the next three seasons before transferring to South Carolina as a graduate transfer. At South Carolina Prentice was named Offensive Player of the game in their historic victory vs Auburn.  Prentice finished his masters in structural engineering at South Carolina.

Professional career

Denver Broncos
Prentice was signed by the Denver Broncos as an undrafted free agent on May 3, 2021. He was waived on August 31, 2021.

New Orleans Saints
Prentice was claimed off of waivers by the New Orleans Saints on September 1, 2021. He was waived on September 14, 2021, and re-signed to the practice squad. Prentice was elevated to the active roster on November 25, 2021, for the team's Week 12 game against the Buffalo Bills and made his NFL debut in the game, starting at fullback and catching a pass from Trevor Siemian for ten yards for his first career reception. He was signed to the active roster on December 2.

Prentice made the Saints final roster in 2022, but was waived on October 1, 2022, and re-signed to the practice squad. He was promoted to the active roster on November 10, 2022.

References

External links
Colorado State Rams bio
South Carolina Gamecocks bio
New Orleans Saints bio

1997 births
Living people
American football fullbacks
Colorado State Rams football players
South Carolina Gamecocks football players
Denver Broncos players
New Orleans Saints players